Stephen Witiuk Sr. (January 8, 1929 – November 30, 2022) was a professional ice hockey player who played almost his entire professional career in the WHL, 15 years in all, recording 332 goals, 454 assists for  786 points in 886 games played. He also played 33 games for the Chicago Black Hawks in the 1951-1952 season.

Witiuk died in Spokane, Washington on November 30, 2022, aged 93.

Awards and achievements
WHL Championships (1954 & 1966)
“Honoured Member” of the Manitoba Hockey Hall of Fame

References

External links

Steve Witiuk’s biography at Manitoba Hockey Hall of Fame

1929 births
2022 deaths
Canadian ice hockey right wingers
Chicago Blackhawks players
Spokane Comets players
Ice hockey people from Winnipeg
Winnipeg Black Hawks players
Winnipeg Rangers players
Winnipeg Warriors (minor pro) players